Orange Crate Art is the first collaborative studio album by American musicians Brian Wilson and Van Dyke Parks, released in 1995 on Warner Bros. Records. The album consists mostly of songs written and arranged by Parks, with Wilson featured as lead and backing vocalist. Its title refers to the sun-drenched, idealized paintings that grace wooden fruit crates, and its theme is a nostalgic view of the history of California.

Background
In the thirty years following their collaboration on the ill-fated Beach Boys' Smile project, Wilson and Parks had each developed their own solo careers.

Sometime in 1992, Parks approached a then-reclusive Wilson with the invitation to record an album together. Wilson was in the middle of a court-ordered removal and restraining order from his psychiatrist, which came as a result of years of over-medication and gross misconduct. According to Parks, "The reason why I asked him was to take care of this unfinished business, and to try to escape from the tyranny of the sense of history that's been placed on our own aborted effort. [Smile]" Later adding, "When I found him, he was alone in a room staring at a television. It was off."

It is reported that Wilson interrupted the first vocal session for the album by asking Parks, "Wait a minute. What am I even doing here?" Parks hit the talk button and responded, "You’re here because I can’t stand the sound of my own voice!" Wilson paused, nodded his head, and stepped up to the microphone proclaiming, "Well, that makes sense! Okay, take one!"

Though billed and anticipated as a full collaboration, the album is devoted to Parks' compositions, and features his typical dense wordplay and orchestrations.  Wilson for his part contributes only the vocals and vocal arrangements. Parks also reported that despite his invitation, Wilson had declined to contribute any music to the project. Despite this, he was impassioned to record the album for Parks, determined to make something that he "could live with" ten years from then.

Reception

Given the history of its artists, the album came with high expectations, but upon release it received mixed critical reviews and had lackluster sales, failing even to chart. Stephen Thomas Erlewine for AllMusic wrote, "Van Dyke Parks' approach is intellectual, not instinctual, which means his compositions are over-labored and overwrought. Instead of making his melodies catchy, Parks makes sure they are complex, which means they are rarely memorable. Similarly, his lyrics are dense and laden with poetic imagery and metaphors, yet they are entirely too cerebral for a pop album. Then again, Orange Crate Art isn't a pop album -- it's a self-conscious work of art."

Parks has repeatedly stated his disappointment with the album's reception, saying "It took three years and $350,000. The record came out and sank without a trace."

Track listing

Personnel
Brian Wilson – vocals
Van Dyke Parks – composer, producer
Leonard Waronker - Executive producer
Additional musicians

References

External links
Orange Crate Art lyrics (with a few minor errors)

1995 albums
Warner Records albums
Van Dyke Parks albums
Brian Wilson albums
Albums produced by Van Dyke Parks
Collaborative albums